Paul Matthieu Hermann Laurent (2 September 1841, in Luxembourg City – 19 February 1908, in Paris, France) was a French mathematician. Despite his large body of works, Laurent series expansions for complex functions were not named after him, but after Pierre Alphonse Laurent.

Publications

References

External links
 
 
  (not born in Echternach)

1841 births
1908 deaths
People from Echternach
19th-century French mathematicians
20th-century French mathematicians
Mathematical analysts